The K239 Chunmoo (Romanization: K239 'Cheon-mu'; Hangul: K239 '천무'; Hanja: K239 '天橆') is a rocket artillery system developed in 2013 to replace the aging K136 Kooryong of the South Korean military.

Design and development
The K239 Chunmoo is a self-propelled multiple rocket launcher (MRL) capable of firing several different guided or unguided artillery rockets.

The K239 is capable of launching K33 131 mm rockets, but not 130 mm rockets (such as the K30, K37 and K38), which are used in the existing K136 Kooryong rocket artillery system. The K239 launcher carries two launch pods that can hold three types of rockets: 

The high explosive warhead bursts on impact for use against personnel and bursts after a delay to destroy bunkers; it was a requirement of the ROK Army for the guided rocket to have a penetrator warhead to be used as a bunker buster solution against the large number of bunkers along the DMZ.

Two different types of rocket pods can be loaded at once. The rocket pod can launch six 239 mm rockets in 30 seconds and a total of 12 rockets in one minute, and it's possible to reload two rocket pods in seven minutes. The launch vehicle is based on a Doosan DST (now Hanwha Defense) K239L 8×8 truck chassis with an armored cab that protects its 3-man crew from small arms fire and artillery shell splinters as well as providing NBC protection.  The vehicle can climb 60% slopes (20 degrees), and is equipped with an Anti-lock Braking System (ABS), Run-flat tires, and a Central Tire Inflation System (CTIS). Each Chunmoo launcher is paired with an K239T Ammunition Support Vehicle (ASV) which uses the same type of truck chassis and carries four reload pods. An ROK Army Chunmoo battery consists of 18 vehicles and uses a K200A1 as a command vehicle.

Origins
Development of the K239 Chunmoo began in 2009 and was completed in late 2013. South Korea's Defense Acquisition Program Administration (DAPA) spent 131.4 billion won ($112.4 million) on the project to create a replacement for the K136 Kooryong MLRS. Initial production was carried out in August 2014. The main purpose of the Chunmoo MLRS is to suppress North Korea's artillery systems in case of war.

 In order to reduce operational and maintenance costs, the Chunmoo launcher system is mounted on the modified chassis of a four-axle Korean truck which has less cross-country ability when compared to tracked vehicles.
 The artillery unit does not have permanently mounted launch rails. This allows the Chunmoo to transport and use launch containers containing different types of rockets from one platform.
 The cockpit of the vehicle is armoured to provides protection against small-calibre weapons and artillery shell fragments.
 It is equipped with a load-lifting device, similar to that of the MLRS. The estimated maximum recharging time is 10 minutes.
 The Chunmoo system includes an ammunition transport and charging vehicle on a common 8x8 chassis, and carries two sets of transport and discharge containers.
 The Korean army requested that the Chunmoo be designed to fire different types of ammunition. This includes 227 mm standard MLRS, but also 131 mm and 239 mm South Korean rockets. The maximum range of the 131 mm ammunition is up to 36 km and approximately 80 km for the 239 mm ammunition.
 Rockets can be fired from the cockpit of the combat vehicle, or by using a remote fire control device.
 Chunmoo system was specified to be transportable by aircraft of the C-130 type, in order to be easily deployed.

Purchase and Deployment

In October 2014, South Korea announced the purchase of 58 Chunmoo MLRS. In August 2015, the ROK Army began deploying the Chunmoo batteries.

Improvements

Extended-range rockets
This would give them range similar to the North Korean 300 mm KN-09. Research and development efforts are evaluating ducted rocket propulsion technology, which adds an air inlet that absorbs external air and combines it with a gas generator for combustion to produce greater thrust, as well as a valve that controls the flow of gas for maneuvering. There is also research into a larger 400 mm rocket, which the Chunmoo could carry four of.

KTSSM-2

On 27 April 2022, South Korean Defense Acquisition Program Administration announced a plan to develop a vehicle-mounted tactical surface-to-surface guided weapon (KTSSM-2). The development project is scheduled to begin in 2023 and plans to complete the development with a total budget of 1.56 trillion won (US$1.232 billion) by 2034.

On 21 December 2022, the Agency for Defense Development conducted a public test of KTSSM-2 under further development at Anheung Proving Ground. The missile was mounted on the K239 Chunmoo vehicle and hit a target 200 kilometers away after it was launched.

On 13 March 2023, the 150th Defense Project Promotion Committee deliberated and approved the basic strategy and system development plan for developing a vehicle-mounted tactical surface-to-surface missile, and the revised plan included the agenda of completing the development of KTSSM-2 by 2032, two years earlier than the previous plan.

Export

United Arab Emirates
In 2017, Hanwha Defense announced at ADEX (Aerospace & Defense Exhibition) in Seoul that it had signed a nondisclosure contract worth 700 billion won to export K239 Chunmoo to a certain country in the Middle East, and it was later revealed that the United Arab Emirates signed a supply contract with Hanwha Defense, including 12 K239 Chunmoos, 12 K239T Ammunition Support Vehicles, GPS-guided rockets, and munitions. Later, In February 2021, 12 K239 Chunmoo systems and 12 K239T Ammunition Support Vehicles were delivered to the United Arab Emirates.

Poland
On 27 August 2022, Poland's defense minister, Mariusz Błaszczak, said there are ongoing negotiations to acquire South Korea's rocket artillery system. On 13 October 2022, Polish Armament Agency announced that the negotiations with South Korea to acquire nearly 300 K239 Chunmoo systems had been completed and the framework agreement will be signed on October 17. Poland had originally intended to procure 500 American M142 HIMARS launchers, but such an order could not be fulfilled in a satisfactory timeline, so decision was made to split the HIMARS order into two stages, buying less of them and adding Chunmoo procurement; the first South Korean launchers are to be delivered in 2023. A supply contract for 288 Chunmoo MLRS mounted on Jelcz 8x8 chassis and equipped with Polish TOPAZ Integrated Combat Management System along with 23 thousand missiles with the range of 80 and 290 kilometers was signed in Poland on October 19, 2022.

Operators

Current operators
: A total of 218 systems are in service in the ROK Army and Marine Corps.
: A total of 12 systems are in service in the United Arab Emirates Army.

Future operators 
: A total of 288 systems will be supplied to Polish Land Forces from 2023.

Potential operators 
: On 27 September 2022, Hanwha Defense signed a memorandum of understanding (MOU) with Norway's Kongsberg Gruppen to introduce the K239 Chunmoo multiple rocket artillery system.
: Romania has expressed interest in acquring Chunmoo launchers for part of its military modernization.

See also
K136 Kooryong - South Korea's 36 extended multiple rocket artillery system

Weapons of comparable role, performance and era
HIMARS
LAR-160
Astros II MLRS
M-87 Orkan

References

External links 

Introduction video of K239 Chunmoo
Operation video of K239 Chunmoo
K33 131 mm rocket launch video of K239 Chunmoo

Self-propelled artillery of South Korea
Wheeled self-propelled rocket launchers
Salvo weapons
Multiple rocket launchers
Modular rocket launchers
Military vehicles introduced in the 2010s